Buck Naked and the Bare Bottom Boys were an American rockabilly band from San Francisco, California.

History
Buck Naked and the Bare Bottom Boys came out of the San Francisco Bay Area in the mid-1980s (originally from Omaha, Nebraska). Lead singer/guitarist Phillip Bury (1954-1992, known by stage name "Buck Naked") performed on stage wearing only cowboy boots, a cowboy hat, a guitar, and a strategically placed toilet plunger. Filling out the band were Buck's brother, Stephen Bury (taking the stage name "Hector Naked") and David Wees (known on stage as "Stinky LePew"). Despite its name, the rest of the band were more or less fully clothed on stage.

The band became friends with the band Primus. Sharing many aesthetic similarities, the latter would make numerous tributes to Bury, in their videos ("Mr. Krinkle" features a painting, "Wynona's Big Brown Beaver" features a bass drum head), and in the album credits to 1993's Pork Soda.

The band's career came to an abrupt end in 1992 when Bury was shot and killed while walking his dog in Golden Gate Park's Panhandle by a cab driver named Michael Kagan, who had for many years fed pigeons there. According to witnesses at the trial, Kagan had been known to threaten dogs who chased the pigeons, and, on occasion, their owners. Kagan appealed the case to the California Supreme Court, but his conviction for manslaughter was upheld. He was sentenced to 16 years in prison, the maximum term allowed.

Discography
 Teenage Pussy From Outer Space (EP)
 Buck Naked and the Bare Bottom Boys (1993)

See also

 Naked Cowboy

References

 
 

Rock music groups from California
Musical groups established in 1986
Musical groups disestablished in 1992
American musical trios